William Lucy (born November 26, 1933) is an American trade union leader. He served as Secretary-Treasurer of the American Federation of State, County and Municipal Employees (AFSCME) from 1972–2010.

Life
Lucy was born to Susie and Joseph Lucy in Memphis, Tennessee on November 26, 1933, and grew up in Richmond, California. In the early 1950s, He studied civil engineering at the University of California, Berkeley but did not obtain a degree. He worked for Contra Costa County as a materials and research engineer, where he would work for the next thirteen years. During this period of time, Lucy started working within the labor movement.

As of 2021, Lucy serves on the board of directors of the NAACP.

Labor movement
Lucy became a member of the American Federation of State, County and Municipal Employees (AFSCME) Local #1675 in 1956 and was elected as its president in 1965. He began working full-time at AFSCME's national headquarters in Washington, D.C. the following year as associate director of legislation and community affairs.

Lucy served as Secretary-Treasurer of AFSCME from 1972 until retiring from the position in 2010. During that period, Lucy co-founded the Coalition of Black Trade Unionists (CBTU), along with fellow black unionists Nelson Edwards, William Simons, Charles Hayes, and Cleveland Robinson. Lucy was elected its first president and continued to serve in that capacity until 2013, when the role was assumed by Terrence Melvin.

Lucy was elected president of Public Services International in 1994, the first African American to hold the post. In 1995, he was appointed to the AFL–CIO executive council. He has also served as vice-president for the AFL–CIO's Maritime Trades, Professional Employees, and Industrial Union departments.

Memphis sanitation strike

In 1968, as part of his leadership role with AFSCME, Lucy lent his support to Martin Luther King Jr. and the mostly black sanitation and other service workers in Memphis who were striking for better wages and benefits. In spite of King's assassination in April 1968, Lucy continued the work in Memphis, helping see the strike to a successful resolution. Lucy is credited with the famous slogan, "I Am A Man!" that became the rallying call for the Memphis strikers.

Free South Africa Movement

Lucy co-founded the Free South Africa Movement, a grassroots anti-apartheid campaign, and was part of the movement for over twenty years. Lucy was part of an AFL–CIO delegation monitoring elections when Nelson Mandela was elected the first black president of South Africa.

Notes

References
 William Lucy, Interview by Everett J. Freeman, 1986, Michigan State University.
 Michael Honey, Going Down Jericho Road: The Memphis Strike, Martin Luther King's Last Campaign, New York: W.W. Norton and Company, 2007.

External links
 AFSCME Secretary-Treasurer William Lucy Archives
 

1933 births
Living people
American trade union leaders
American Federation of State, County and Municipal Employees people
African-American trade unionists
Activists from Tennessee
People from Memphis, Tennessee
People from Richmond, California
Trade unionists from California
Anti-apartheid activists
21st-century African-American people
20th-century African-American people